Wildlife diversity is a notable feature of Nepal. Because of the variance in climate, from tropical to arctic, Nepal has a large variety of plants and animals. Wildlife tourism is also a major source of tourism in the country. There are some animal species which are unique to Nepal, such as the spiny babbler. Nepal is also host to many rhododendron species. The wildlife of Nepal includes its flora and fauna. Nepal has established numerous national parks and reserves in order to protect its diverse fauna. Nepal is a biodiversity hot spot with ecoregions broadly comprising the mountainous ecoregion, the savanna and grasslands ecoregion of the terai (foothills), and the Rara Lake ecoregion, which has many endemic species.

Legal protection
Nepal has established numerous national parks and reserves in order to protect its diverse fauna ever since 1973, with the passing of the National Parks and Wildlife Conservation Act 2029 BS. There are four different "classes" of protection, ranging from national parks and nature reserves to wildlife and hunting reserves. Under these classes as of 2002 there were 23 protected areas in Nepal: nine national parks, three wildlife reserves, three conservation areas, one hunting reserve, three additional Ramsar sites, and four additional World Heritage Sites. The most noted world heritage sites are Sagarmatha National Park and Chitwan National Park. In addition, the world heritage site in the Kathmandu Valley also covers zones of significant biodiversity.

Animals

Mammals
There are 208 mammal species reported including 28 species outside the limits of the protected areas but excluding four known extinct species. Among the several species of mammal found in Nepal, notable are the Bengal fox, Bengal tiger, clouded leopard, corsac fox, Indian rhinoceros, Asiatic elephant, marbled cat, Indian Pangolin, Chinese Pangolin, red panda, snow leopard, Tibetan fox and Tibetan wolf. Some of these, including the internationally recognized snow leopard are endangered and at risk of extinction. Wild yak, thought to be regional extinct in 1970s, was rediscovered in 2014.

Reptiles
There are several different types of reptile native to the country, ranging from pit vipers to monitor lizards. Some of the more prominent examples include the Bengal monitor, Gloydius himalayanus (a pit viper), the elongated tortoise (Indotestudo elongata), Trimeresurus septentrionalis, and the yellow monitor. Although the above are found elsewhere in southeast Asia, there are quite a few reptile species unique to the country, including Sitana fusca and Cyrtodactylus nepalensis.
Sitana sivalensis, Japalura tricarinata, the Annapurna ground skink (Scincella capitanea), the lidless skink (Asymblepharus nepalensis), geckos (Cyrtodactylus martinstolli), Shah's bamboo pit viper (Trimeresurus karanshahi) and the Tibetan pit viper (Gloydius strauchi) are also reptiles found in Nepal.

In 2019, the first successful gharial reproduction since 1982 was confirmed.

Avifauna

There are approximately 27 Important Bird Areas in the country and over 900 bird species (as of 2012) known to exist in Nepal of which 30 species are globally threatened, 1 species is endemic and 1 species is introduced. The danphe, the national bird, is a type of pheasant. In addition, there are eight species of stork, five other species of pheasant, six minivets, seventeen different cuckoos, thirty flycatchers, and sixty species of warblers. The spiny babbler is the only species endemic to Nepal. Spiny babblers are not mammals. True mammals are vertebrates just like humans and they have some defining features like having 4 limbs and 3 holes in their skulls. But babblers are birds and they have a lot of defining features that separate them from humans. For example, they have a lighter, more hollow bones than us, they have claws on the tip of their wings and they have beaks instead of an upper jaw.

Aquatic fauna
The aquatic faunal species reported from the water bodies in Nepal are: pharping catfish (Myersglanis blythii), Psilorhynchus nepalensis, Nepalese minnow (Psilorhynchus pseudecheneis), Nepalese snowtrout (Schizothorax macrophthalmus), Turcinoemacheilus himalaya, erethistid catfishes (Erethistoides ascita and Erethistoides cavatura), bagrid catfish (Batasio macronotus) and sisorid catfishes (such as Pseudecheneis eddsi, Pseudecheneis crassicauda and Pseudecheneis serracula).

Invertebrates
Some of the important insect species reported are: ground beetles (Cychropsis nepalensis), Nebria molendai, dung beetles (Caccobius scheuerni), longhorned beetles (Hesperoclytus katarinae), moths (Heterolocha mariailgeae), katydids (Isopsera caligula), mole crickets (Gryllotalpa pygmaea), grasshoppers (Nepalocaryanda latifrons), bees (Andrena kathmanduensis), ant-mimicking thrips (Franklinothrips strasseni) and damselflies (Calicnemia nipalica). Other invertebrates reported are tarantulas (Haplocosmia nepalensis), goblin spiders (Brignolia ankhu), jumping spiders (Euophrys omnisuperstes), scorpions (Heterometrus nepalensis), centipedes (Cryptops nepalensis), land snails (Darwininitium shiwalikianum and Laevozebrinus nepalensis), and freshwater snails (Tricula mahadevensis).

Flora

Research undertaken in the late 1970s and early 1980s documented 5,067 species of which 5041 were angiosperms and the remaining 26 species were gymnosperms. The Terai area has hardwood, bamboo, palm, and sal trees. Notable plants include the garden angelica, Luculia gratissima, Meconopsis villosa, and Persicaria affinis. However, according to ICOMOS checklist (as of 2006), in the protected sites, there are 2,532 species of vascular plants under 1,034 genera and 199 families. The variation in figures is attributed to inadequate floral coverage filed studies.

There are 400 species of vascular plants which are endemic to Nepal. Of these, two in particular are orchids Pleione coronaria and Oreorchis porphyranthes.

National flower
The most popular endemic plant of Nepal is rhododendron (arboreum) which in Nepali language is called guras. Lali Guras (red rhododendron) is especially popular. It is grown extensively throughout Nepal, and particularly in the elevation range of 1,400–3,600 m. The flower is a national symbol and part of the cultural and religious ethos of the country. It symbolizes "national unity and people's sovereignty" and "reflects the spirit of Lok tantra (republic) marked by inclusiveness and gender parity." The red rhododendron flowers forms the decorative ring in the form of wreath around the national emblem of Nepal which comprise the flag of Nepal, Mount Everest, green mountains, yellow colour representing the fertile Terai region (foothills region of the Himalayas) and with hands of male and female joined representing gender equality, and with an outline of the map of Nepal in the background. Below this emblem there is an inscription in Sanskrit which reads jananī janmabhūmiśca svargādapi garīyasī, which means "Mother and the motherland are greater than heaven." It is also used in traditional medicine to cure dysentery.

Protected species of fauna
There are 38 protected wildlife species of fauna including birds of which 50% are in various stages of threat. These are the following:
Vulnerable
 Antilope cervicapra (blackbuck)
 Bos gaurus (gaur)
 Canis lupus (Tibetan wolf)
 Neofelis nebulosa (clouded leopard)
 Platanista gangetica (Gangetic dolphin)
 Python molurus (Asiatic rock python)
Endangered
 Bos mutus (wild yak, rediscovered in 2014)
 Bubalus bubalis (wild water buffalo)
 Caprolagus hispidus (hispid hare)
 Cervus duvauceli (swamp deer)
 Elephas maximus (Asiatic elephant)
 Felis lynx (Eurasian lynx)
 Moschus chrysogaster (Himalayan musk deer)
 Panthera tigris (royal Bengal tiger)
 Panthera uncia (snow leopard)
 Catreus wallichii (cheer pheasant)
 Eupodotis bengalensis (Bengal florican)
 Gavialis gangeticus (gharial)
Extirpated
Sus salvanius (pygmy hog)
Indeterminate species
 Ovis ammon (great Tibetan sheep)
 Varanus flavescens (golden monitor)

See also 
 Fauna of Nepal

References 

Biota of Nepal
Nepal
Wildlife of Nepal